Constance D'Arcy Mackay (1887 – 21 August 1966) was an American writer and playwright. She was a charter member of PEN International and authored over sixty plays in her time.

References

External links

 Constance D'Arcy MacKay papers, 1915-1939, held by the Billy Rose Theatre Division, New York Public Library for the Performing Arts
 
 

1966 deaths
1887 births
Date of birth unknown
American women dramatists and playwrights
Place of birth missing
Place of death missing
PEN International